Flindersiella endophytica is an endophytic bacterium from the genus Flindersiella which has been isolated from the tree Eucalyptus microcarpa in Adelaide in Australia.

References 

Propionibacteriales
Bacteria described in 2011